The Kenyon Review is a literary magazine based in Gambier, Ohio, US, home of Kenyon College.  The Review was founded in 1939 by John Crowe Ransom, critic and professor of English at Kenyon College, who served as its editor until 1959.  The Review has published early works by generations of important writers, including Robert Penn Warren, Ford Madox Ford, Robert Lowell, Delmore Schwartz, Flannery O'Connor, Boris Pasternak, Bertolt Brecht, Peter Taylor, Dylan Thomas, Anthony Hecht, Maya Angelou, Rita Dove, Derek Walcott, Thomas Pynchon, Don Delillo, Woody Allen, Louise Erdrich, William Empson, Linda Gregg, Mark Van Doren, Kenneth Burke, and Ha Jin.

The magazine's short stories have won more O. Henry Awards than any other nonprofit journal—42 in all. Many poems that first appeared in the quarterly have been reprinted in The Best American Poetry series, and the magazine is one of the most frequent sources for the series, where poems originally in The Kenyon Review have appeared in the editions for 1992, 1993, 1994, 1996, 1997, 1998, 2001, 2002, 2003, and 2006.

History

The magazine was started in 1939. During his 21-year tenure as editor, John Crowe Ransom made the magazine "perhaps the best known and most influential literary magazine in the English-speaking world during the 1940s and '50s".

In 1959 Robie Macauley succeeded Ransom as editor of The Kenyon Review, where he published fiction and poetry by John Barth, T. S. Eliot, Nadine Gordimer, Robert Graves, Randall Jarrell, Richmond Lattimore, Doris Lessing, Robert Lowell, V. S. Naipaul, Joyce Carol Oates, Frank O'Connor, V. S. Pritchett, Thomas Pynchon, J. F. Powers, Karl Shapiro, Jean Stafford, Christina Stead, Peter Taylor, and Robert Penn Warren, as well as articles, essays and book reviews by Eric Bentley, Cleanth Brooks, R. P. Blackmur, Malcolm Cowley, Richard Ellmann, Leslie Fiedler, Martin Green, and Raymond Williams. During Macauley's tenure The Kenyon Review published the first reviews in English of Tristes Tropiques and A Clockwork Orange.

A decade after Ransom left the magazine, in 1969, Kenyon College closed it down as its reputation dropped and financial burdens continued. In 1979, however, the quarterly was started up again. Marilyn Hacker, a poet, became the magazine's first full-time editor. "She quickly broadened the quarterly's scope to include more minority and marginalized viewpoints," according to the magazine.

In April 1994, the college trustees directed that costs be cut and revenues increased in various ways. Hacker left and an English professor at the college, David H. Lynn (acting editor in 1989–1990), took over on a two-thirds time basis. The publication's finances have stabilized and improved, and a Kenyon Review Board of Trustees has been set up.

The Kenyon Review Short Fiction Prize, established in 2008, is awarded annually to a writer who has not previously published a work of fiction.  Cara Blue Adams won the inaugural contest, judged by novelist Alice Hoffman, while Nick Ripatrazone and Megan Mayhew Bergman were named runners-up.

Kenyon Review Award for Literary Achievement

The "Kenyon Review Award for Literary Achievement" was created in 2002 to honor careers of extraordinary literary achievement, recognizing writers whose influence and importance have shaped the American literary landscape. It celebrates writers for the courage of their vision, their unparalleled imagination, and for the beauty of their art. The award is presented at a gala benefit dinner each year in New York City.

The first award was presented to novelist E.L. Doctorow (Kenyon College '52). Novelist and short-story writer Joyce Carol Oates received the award in 2003, while poet Seamus Heaney won it in 2004. The 2005 honorees were Umberto Eco, the novelist, and Roger Angell, the New Yorker fiction editor and baseball writer. In 2006 Ian McEwan received the award; Margaret Atwood followed in 2007, and Pulitzer Prize winning Independence Day author Richard Ford in 2008. In 2009 Louise Erdrich was honored, and in 2010 poet W.S. Merwin received the award. Historian, essayist and critic Simon Schama was the winner in 2011. Author and human rights advocate Elie Wiesel received the honor in 2012. In 2013 the poet Carl Phillips received the award, followed by novelist Ann Patchett in 2014. Roger Rosenblatt, author and playwright, won in 2015. The Kenyon Review honored author Hilary Mantel in 2016, and in 2017 acknowledged author Colm Toibin. In 2018, the award recognized American poet and essayist Rita Dove, a National Humanities and National Medal of Arts recipient, Pulitzer Prize winner and past U.S. poet laureate. In 2019, novelist, short story writer and USC Distinguished Professor of English T.C. Boyle received the award. While no award event took place in 2020, in 2021 the Board of Trustees honored its long serving editor, now editor emeritus, David Lynn as the nineteenth recipient of the Kenyon Review Award for Literary Achievement.

Proceeds from the annual dinner go to the Kenyon Review's endowment fund, which supports both the magazine and the scholarships and fellowships to the Review's summer writing programs. In 2017, members of the Board of Trustees of Kenyon College, Kenyon Review and Gund Gallery established the E.L. Doctorow Fund to provide additional scholarship support to a student committed to arts and literature.

Poetry submissions
Poetry editor David Baker, in a 2019 interview, provided information on submissions and the process. The magazine receives over 3,000 submissions a year (batches, not individual poems), and publishes some 50 of them per year in the print version, another 25 in the annual "Nature's Nature" feature on ecopoetics (published May-June). Of those 75, perhaps 15 or 20 are solicited, and so around 60 come via the open submission route.  More poems are published in the Kenyon Review Online. A group of trained student associates do part of the first reading and they have the right to reject; it takes two such rejections before a poem is actually rejected. Baker does the final selection, and David Lynn does the "final sign-off".

See also
 Jean Farley
 List of literary magazines

Notes

External links 
 

1939 establishments in Ohio
Poetry magazines published in the United States
Quarterly magazines published in the United States
Kenyon College
Magazines established in 1939
Magazines published in Ohio
Poetry literary magazines